Paziella is a genus of sea snails, marine gastropod mollusks in the subfamily Muricinae  of the family Muricidae, the murex snails or rock snails.

Description
The biconic, medium-sized shell has its varices dissected into spines. The aperture is ovoid and smooth inside. The anal sinus is almost closed. The columella is smooth.

This Caribbean genus is closely related to Poirieria from the Indo-Pacific region.

Species
Species within the genus Paziella include:
 Paziella atlantis (Clench & Farfante, 1945)
 Paziella galapagana (Emerson & D'Attilio, 1970)
 † Paziella gallica Landau, Merle, Ceulemans & Van Dingenen, 2019 
 † Paziella gracilenta Landau, Merle, Ceulemans & Van Dingenen, 2019 
 † Paziella modesta Vicián, Kovács & Stein, 2019 
 Paziella nuttingi (Dall, 1896) 
 Paziella oregonia (Bullis, 1964)
 † Paziella parveenae Merle & Pacaud, 2019 
 Paziella pazi (Crosse, 1869) 
 Paziella petuchi (Vokes, 1992)
 Paziella tanaoa (Houart & Tröndlé, 2008)
Species brought into synonymy
 Paziella hystricina (Dall, 1889): synonym of Bouchetia hystricina (Dall, 1889)
 Paziella oliverai (Kosuge, 1984): synonym of Flexopteron oliverai (Kosuge, 1984)
 † Paziella philippinensis (Shuto, 1969): synonym of † Flexopteron philippinensis Shuto, 1969 
 Paziella poppei (Houart, 1993): synonym of Flexopteron poppei (Houart, 1993)
 Paziella primanova (Houart, 1985): synonym of Flexopteron primanova (Houart, 1985)
 Paziella vaubanensis (Houart, 1986): synonym of Bouchetia vaubanensis (Houart, 1986)

References

 Merle D., Garrigues B. & Pointier J.-P. (2011) Fossil and Recent Muricidae of the world. Part Muricinae. Hackenheim: Conchbooks. 648 pp.

External links
 Jousseaume, F. P. (1880). Division méthodique de la famille des Purpuridés. Le Naturaliste. 2(42): 335-338.

Muricidae
Gastropod genera
Gastropods described in 1880
Taxa named by Félix Pierre Jousseaume